Robert Christison (1797–1882) was a Scottish toxicologist and physician

Robert Christison may also refer to:

Robert Christison (pastoralist) (1837–1915), Australian pastoralist
Sir Robert Alexander Christison, 3rd Baronet (1870–1945) of the Christison baronets

See also
Christison (surname)